is a Japanese retired professional wrestler and mixed martial artist. Once a student of legendary professional wrestlers Billy Robinson, Lou Thesz and Akira Maeda, Tamura was known for his skills in catch wrestling and is considered to be one of the greatest shoot wrestlers of all time. Competing exclusively in shoot style wrestling, Tamura began his career with UWF Newborn and later joined its successor group UWF International before transitioning to mixed martial arts.

A professional MMA fighter from 1995 until 2008, he competed for the PRIDE Fighting Championships, RINGS, DEEP, DREAM, and fought at K-1's 2007 and 2008 Dynamite!! events. He is a two-time RINGS Openweight Champion and holds notable wins over Renzo Gracie, former UFC Welterweight Champion Pat Miletich, former UFC Middleweight Champion Dave Menne, former Pancrase Super Heavyweight Champion Tsuyoshi Kosaka, former Pancrase Openweight Champion Masakatsu Funaki, Olympic judo gold medallist Makoto Takimoto, three-time sambo champion Volk Han, and Kazushi Sakuraba. Tamura currently serves as an Executive Director for LIDET Entertainment's professional wrestling promotion GLEAT.

Professional wrestling career

UWF Newborn (1989–1990)
A former sumo wrestler for the Okayama University of Science High School, Tamura debuted in 1989 in the UWF Newborn in a losing effort against Minoru Suzuki. He soon revealed himself as a promising rookie, but he was forced to put his career in a long hiatus after a match with Akira Maeda on October 25, in which Maeda hit him with a full force knee strike and fractured his orbital bone. Tamura took an entire year to return, and he only had time to work in one event before UWF closed.

UWF International (1991–1996) 
After UWF's demise, Tamura followed to its main successor group, UWF International, where he was put under the tutelage of Nobuhiko Takada. Debuting with a victory against Masahito Kakihara, Tamura was spunky and could even demand respect from older veterans, as demonstrated during a bout against Yoji Anjo where Tamura broke a hold, delivered several kicks to Anjo's head and kicked him out of the ring.

In 1992, after making his shootfighting debut before boxer Matthew Saad Muhammad, submitting him with a rear naked choke, Tamura was sent to United States to learn catch wrestling under Lou Thesz, who helped refine Tamura's submission skills and ground game. He returned a few months later with a new, polished grappling style, defeating Kazuo Yamazaki in a match without shin guards on October 23. Only some months after, on February 14, 1993, Tamura had a high level match with Nobuhiko Takada, after which many pundits (such as Pro Wrestling Illustrated) compared him to Takada himself and considered him as a candidate for the future ace of the company. By this time, however, Tamura had witnessed the birth of mixed martial arts promotion Pancrase and had become interested by real fighting, like the bout he had fought against Saad.

The next year, Tamura took part in the Best Of The World 1994 Tournament, advancing through the rounds by beating Bad News Allen and Naoki Sano, but being eliminated himself by eventual winner Super Vader at the semi-finals. He also went to lose the match for the second place to main eventer Gary Albright, and never challenged Vader for the title.

Unsatisfied with the symbolic return of UWF to gimmicky puroresu with the victory of Vader, and further inspired by the recent success of Pancrase, Tamura proposed to take a direction towards realistic wrestling again. He would compete in a notable shoot fight against Masahito Kakihara on February 18, 1995, winning by rear naked choke in 2:06. Later, he was granted a victorious rematch against Gary Albright, but the match became infamous for Albright's unwillingness to cooperate, which ruined Tamura's win to the point of having him in tears. The same night, Nobuhiko Takada announced his decision to retire from pro wrestling to pursue a politic career, which was met with harsh words by Tamura. After a new rematch with Albright on August, Tamura addressed the returning Takada and challenged him to a mixed martial arts fight, to no avail.

The same year, UWF International was forced by financial issues into an interpromotional feud against New Japan Pro-Wrestling, but Tamura refused to participate. As a consequence, he was subjected to cold treatment backstage and found himself training alone often. In December 1995, Kiyoshi offered himself instead to represent UWF-i at the event K-1 Hercules, in a mixed martial arts fight against Ultimate Fighting Championship veteran Patrick Smith. However, he won the fight.

Tamura returned to UWF-i to feud with Kazushi Sakuraba, but the rivalry was relegated to mid to undercard. He concluded in his intention to leave the company, and asked to be released. He had his final match on May 27, where he defeated Sakuraba and, after the bout, took off his own shin guards and threw them to the audience before leaving the arena.

Fighting Network RINGS (1996–2001) 
After negotiations with Pancrase, Tamura jumped to Fighting Network RINGS, founded by old mentor Maeda, citing a better contract. He was briefly pushed as the top star, being given the first RINGS heavyweight titles. By 1995, RINGS was making the transition from shoot style wrestling to mixed martial arts and Tamura began competing actively in both. In 2001, Tamura fought for the final time in RINGS.

Post-RINGS (2003–present)
In 2003 he opened his own promotion, U-STYLE. On November 23, 2005 he had his last match for this promotion, defeating Josh Barnett. He briefly came out of retirement for Antonio Inoki's Inoki Genome Federation, the last time being on November 8, 2007, beating Montanha Silva in the latter's IGF debut. In 2020, Tamura joined LIDET Entertainment's GLEAT promotion as an Executive Director.

Mixed martial arts career

Overview
Tamura's 32 career wins include victories over mixed martial arts greats such as Jeremy Horn, Renzo Gracie, Ikuhisa Minowa, Nobuhiko Takada, Pat Miletich and held Frank Shamrock to a draw at a time when Shamrock was reigning UFC champion. However, in spite of his many accomplishments inside the arena of MMA, his record is somewhat marred by a preponderance of match-ups against top heavyweight and light-heavyweight competitors, including Antônio Rodrigo Nogueira, the 350-pound Bob Sapp and the former Olympic gold medalist Hidehiko Yoshida amongst others.

His later mixed martial arts performances have also been criticized as being relatively apathetic compared to the fast-paced bouts that characterized the earlier part of his career. Part of this may owe to an absence of grappling in the bouts in question, where Tamura has often seemed more content to pursue a cautious stand-up game rather than engage in the submission exchanges he was at one point famed for.

Kiyoshi had his first taste of MMA back in professional wrestling promotion Union of Wrestling Forces International, where he choked out boxer Matthew Saad Muhammad in a mixed rules bout in 1992 and also in 1995 where he beat fellow UWF-i wrestler Masahito Kakihara via rear naked choke in a shoot contest. He later offered to fight in the K-1 Hercules MMA event, where he made short work of Patrick Smith via heel hook.

Fighting Network RINGS
After his switch to MMA in Fighting Network RINGS, he submitted a striker in the form of Andre Mannaart, and was pitted against sambo and kickboxing expert Valentijn Overeem in his next shoot match. Outweighed by 25 lbs, Tamura managed to take Overeem down early in the fight and fought for a kimura, however Overeem submitted Tamura multiple times, the Japanese ultimately losing the match by kneebar. It forced the RING executives to make him lose the Openweight Championship to Tariel Bitsadze. He then had an acclaimed draw against teammate Tsuyoshi Kohsaka.

In 1999, Tamura faced former Pancrase star Frank Shamrock, who had defeated Tamura's teammate Tsuyoshi Kohsaka years before and become his training partner in The Alliance. Tamura controlled the match, taking down Shamrock and keeping dominant position over him, but he was forced to spend a rope escape when Shamrock caught him in an armbar in his first takedown. The Japanese retaliated by threatening him with a Kimura lock, another armbar and a pair of scarf hold armlocks which almost finished the fight, but the American miraculously escaped from all of them. After twelve minutes, however, Shamrock lost the point for an illegal closed-fisted punch, balancing their respective point scores and forcing him to switch to attack. Shamrock attempted a Kimura lock and an ankle hold, but Tamura defended them successfully and the time of the match ran out. It was declared a draw by points.

The same year, Tamura took part in the King of Kings tournament, facing Dave Menne as his first opponent. He landed several hooks, but lost the advantage upon attempting a flying armbar. After the restart, they exchanged strikes until Menne slipped down on a high kick, which Tamura capitalized in order to mount Menne on the ground and throw punches. Finally, Tamura knocked down Dave again and took his back, ending the match with a unanimous decision.

Following an uneventful second round win over Borislav Jeliazkov, Tamura found himself pitted against Renzo Gracie from the Gracie family. The Brazilian fighter got the earliest of the fight with a guillotine choke from the guard, but Tamura started to dominate thanks to his superior striking and takedown defense. Believing himself to be the superior on the ground, Renzo lied down and challenged Tamura to grapple with him, which the Japanese shooter did, managing to pass his guard and taking the back of the Brazilian jiu-jitsu specialist. After returning to the standing position by the referee's order, Tamura captured the back again by reversing a takedown and locked crucifix, which he used to pursue a choke until the end of the time. Tamura was awarded the unanimous decision, being the second Japanese in defeating a Gracie after Kazushi Sakuraba did it with Royler earlier in the year.

At the semifinals, Kiyoshi fought Brazilian luta livre exponent Renato Sobral, 40 pounds heavier than the Japanese. The stronger Sobral attacked with knee strikes and took his back in some occasions while Tamura landed leg kicks and looked for an opening. Going to the ground, both attempted several kinds of submissions, including an armbar by Sobral and a figure four toehold by Tamura, but they were unsuccessful. Ended the battle, two judges ruled a draw and a third one (Jon Bluming) ruled in Sobral's favor, thus eliminating Tamura from the tournament.

On April 20, 2000, Tamura put in the line his RINGS Openweight Championship (won against Tariel Bitsadze in a professional wrestling match) in a mixed martial arts fight against RINGS Holland fighter Gilbert Yvel. The best wrestler of the two, Tamura was able to take dominant position on the ground multiple times, but the rule against punches to the face on the mat, the referee's quick standups, and Yvel's own defensive grappling acumen impeded him from gaining the advantage. Yvel, the best striker, landed several knees and punches through the match, and towards the end of the second round landed a series of strikes, making the referee stop the match in his favor.

Tamura bounced back from his title loss representing RINGS in the Colosseum 2000 event, where he was pitted against Jeremy Horn. The bigger American managed to difficult Tamura's takedowns, but the Japanese gained dominance with striking despite not wearing gloves (which forced him to use only open-handed strikes). At the second round, action slowed down in Tamura's butterfly guard, and although the American passed it at the last minutes and sought to establish a submission, time went out for a decision win for Tamura. In August 2000, Tamura fought as well Pat Miletich, Horn's teammate. Unlike the previous match, Tamura controlled the striking, landing several leg kicks. The contenders exchanged takedowns at both rounds, but Tamura achieved positional control more often, thus winning a majority decision.

In October 2000, Tamura partaked in the King of Kings tournament as well, eliminating Zaza Tkeshelashvili before going against another Brazilian, Antônio Rodrigo Nogueira. The jiu-jitsu expert opened the match taking Tamura down and trying to pass his guard, eventually performing an armbar which Kiyoshi countered rolling outwards and taking his back. The Japanese fighter then avoided a kneebar and attacked Nogueira's guard until the standup. The action repeated itself, with Nogueira taking him down and Tamura capitalizing on a kneebar attempt to get dominant position, but this time Nogueira reversed and attempted a Kimura lock for the end of the round. At the second one, the Brazilian pressed Tamura with a takedown and slowly climbed up his way through positions to an armbar from the back. Kiyoshi defended it for minutes, but at the end, Nogueira repositioned and got the hold, making Tamura tap out.

After his King of Kings tenure, Tamura was granted a rematch against Renato Sobral, but as in the first time, the bigger Brazilian controlled the bout with wrestling and positional dominance. Kiyoshi had his last fight for RINGS facing Gustavo Machado, losing an uneventful decision again.

PRIDE Fighting Championships
Tamura made his debut in PRIDE Fighting Championships in a title fight against Wanderlei Silva for the PRIDE Middleweight Championship. Silva blocked Tamura's takedowns and attacked him with hard punches and a knee to the face. In one instance, Tamura landed a punch which stunned Wanderlei, but it was short-lived, and the Brazilian fighter recovered and continued with the brutal ground and pound, bloodying Kiyoshi's face. The second round saw the same action, with Silva counterstriking with a right hook which knocked out Tamura for the win.

After the bout, there were suggestions for Tamura to portray the Tiger Mask professional wrestling gimmick in the Pride ring, having his first match against Ryan Gracie. However, those plans were abandoned.

Tamuras next match would be a similarly tough matchup, facing the large Bob Sapp, who almost doubled Tamura's weight. The match was short and shocking, and saw Sapp charging at Tamura and knocking him out with looping punches at 0:11.

At PRIDE 31, Tamura got a desired rematch against Antônio Rodrigo Nogueira, who had bested him years before in RINGS. The result would be the same, as Nogueira took him down, gained his back and locked an armbar for the tap out.

In an event for related promotion Deep in September 2002, Tamura defeated another shoot-style fighter, Ikuhisa Minowa, by unanimous decision. They had a rematch in PRIDE two years later, which was much shorter, with Tamura overwhelming Minowa with leg kicks and a knee strike, followed by soccer kicks to the head. Tamura and Minowa shook hands as a sign of respect after the match, though Tamura featured an incident in which he shoved the referee for what was believed to be a late stoppage.

In August 2003, Tamura fought judo medalist Hidehiko Yoshida in the latter's third MMA fight. Showing his experience, Tamura knocked him down with a left cross and worked through his guard before returning to their feet. Afterwards, the shoot wrestler landed continuous kicks to Yoshida's legs and body, also capturing his back once during a failed judo throw. Finally, Yoshida threw Tamura down and forced him to tap to a quick sode guruma jime. The strange sequence of the choke brought accusations of a fixed fight performed to increase Yoshida's popularity, but Dave Meltzer and other pundits considered it dubious, attributing it to Tamura's own inexperience with gi chokes.

For several years, efforts have been made by PRIDE to put Tamura and fellow UWFi alum and mixed martial artist Kazushi Sakuraba together in a fight due to their status as two of the best Japanese fighters of their time as well as a rumored rivalry. An announcement was made at PRIDE 34 by Nobuyuki Sakakibara that promised the fans a future fight between the two. However, PRIDE ceased being an active promotion after that event.

Post-PRIDE
At K-1 Premium 2007, Tamura faced Hideo Tokoro, an apprentice of former RINGS wrestler Kenichi Yamamoto. Outweighing his opponent by 17 kg (38 lbs) and showing a brilliant submission defense, Tamura kept control over him in the grappling exchanges, taking his back several times and grinding him with punches and ground and pound, until he locked a stretch armlock from a keylock position in round 3 to make him tap out.

A year after, Tamura would fight yet another shoot-style fighter, this time the Pancrase legend Masakatsu Funaki. Despite the hype surrounding the fight, caused by RINGS' and Pancrase' former rivalry, the bout was swift, with Tamura outstriking him and tripping him to the mat for the ground and pound TKO.

Finally it was announced that Kiyoshi Tamura and Kazushi Sakuraba were set to fight at the K-1 Dynamite!! event on December 31, 2008. The fight was characterized by Tamura generally countering take-down and submission attempts by Sakuraba while applying ground and pound from the top position throughout the bout. At the end of the first round, Sakuraba appeared to have an armbar locked in, but Tamura held on and in the second controlled much of the action until being taken down by Sakuraba in the final minute. Ultimately, Tamura was awarded a unanimous decision.

Personal life
On July 7, 2007, Tamura married tarento and pro wrestling host Yumiko Sakurai.

Championships and accomplishments

Mixed martial arts
 Fighting Network RINGS
 RINGS Openweight Championship (Two times; first)
 1997 RINGS Mega Battle Tournament Winner
 1996 RINGS Mega Battle Tournament Runner Up
 1999 RINGS King of Kings Tournament Semifinalist

Professional wrestling
 Pro Wrestling Illustrated
 PWI ranked him #98 of the top 500 singles wrestlers of the "PWI Years" in 2003
 Wrestling Observer Newsletter awards
 Best Technical Wrestler (1998)

Mixed martial arts record 

|-
| Win
| align=center| 32–13–3
| Kazushi Sakuraba
| Decision (unanimous)
| Fields Dynamite!! 2008
| 
| align=center| 2
| align=center| 5:00
| Saitama, Saitama, Japan
| 
|-
| Win
| align=center| 31–13–3
| Masakatsu Funaki
| TKO (punches)
| DREAM 2: Middleweight Grand Prix 2008 First Round
| 
| align=center| 1
| align=center| 0:57
| Saitama, Saitama, Japan
| 
|-
| Win
| align=center| 30–13–3
| Hideo Tokoro
| Submission (straight armbar)
| K-1 Premium 2007 Dynamite!!
| 
| align=center| 3
| align=center| 3:08
| Osaka, Japan
| 
|-
| Loss
| align=center| 29–13–3
| Taiei Kin
| Decision (unanimous)
| HERO'S 9
| 
| align=center| 2
| align=center| 5:00
| Yokohama, Japan
| 
|-
| Win
| align=center| 29–12–3
| Ikuhisa Minowa
| KO (soccer kicks)
| PRIDE FC: Shockwave 2006
| 
| align=center| 1
| align=center| 1:18
| Saitama, Saitama, Japan
| 
|-
| Loss
| align=center| 28–12–3
| Antônio Rodrigo Nogueira
| Submission (armbar)
| PRIDE 31: Dreamers
| 
| align=center| 1
| align=center| 2:24
| Saitama, Saitama, Japan
| 
|-
| Win
| align=center| 28–11–3
| Makoto Takimoto
| Decision (unanimous)
| PRIDE Critical Countdown 2005
| 
| align=center| 3
| align=center| 5:00
| Saitama, Saitama, Japan
| 
|-
| Win
| align=center| 27–11–3
| Aliev Makhmud
| TKO (retirement)
| PRIDE 29
| 
| align=center| 1
| align=center| 7:09
| Saitama, Saitama, Japan
| 
|-
| Win
| align=center| 26–11–3
| Rony Sefo
| Submission (armbar)
| PRIDE Shockwave 2003
| 
| align=center| 1
| align=center| 2:20
| Saitama, Saitama, Japan
| 
|-
| Loss
| align=center| 25–11–3
| Hidehiko Yoshida
| Submission (Ezekiel choke)
| PRIDE Total Elimination 2003
| 
| align=center| 1
| align=center| 5:06
| Saitama, Saitama, Japan
| 
|-
| Win
| align=center| 25–10–3
| Nobuhiko Takada
| KO (punch)
| PRIDE 23
| 
| align=center| 2
| align=center| 1:00
| Tokyo, Japan
| 
|-
| Win
| align=center| 24–10–3
| Ikuhisa Minowa
| Decision (unanimous)
| DEEP: 6th Impact
| 
| align=center| 3
| align=center| 5:00
| Tokyo, Japan
| 
|-
| Loss
| align=center| 
| Bob Sapp
| KO (punches)
| PRIDE 21
| 
| align=center| 1
| align=center| 0:11
| Saitama, Saitama, Japan
| 
|-
| Loss
| align=center| 23–9–3
| Wanderlei Silva
| KO (punch)
| PRIDE 19
| 
| align=center| 2
| align=center| 2:28
| Saitama, Saitama, Japan
| 
|-
| Loss
| align=center| 23–8–3
| Gustavo Machado
| Decision (unanimous)
| RINGS: World Title Series 1
| 
| align=center| 2
| align=center| 5:00
| Tokyo, Japan
| 
|-
| Loss
| align=center| 23–7–3
| Renato Sobral
| Decision (majority)
| RINGS: King of Kings 2000 Final
| 
| align=center| 2
| align=center| 5:00
| Tokyo, Japan
| 
|-
| Loss
| align=center| 23–6–3
| Antônio Rodrigo Nogueira
| Submission (armbar)
| rowspan=2|RINGS: King of Kings 2000 Block A
| rowspan=2|
| align=center| 2
| align=center| 2:29
| rowspan=2|Tokyo, Japan
| 
|-
| Win
| align=center| 23–5–3
| Zaza Tkeshelashvili
| Decision (unanimous)
| align=center| 2
| align=center| 5:00
| 
|-
| Win
| align=center| 22–5–3
| Pat Miletich
| Decision (majority)
| RINGS: Millennium Combine 3
| 
| align=center| 2
| align=center| 5:00
| Osaka, Japan
| 
|-
| Win
| align=center| 21–5–3
| Jeremy Horn
| Decision (unanimous)
| C2K: Colosseum 2000
| 
| align=center| 2
| align=center| 5:00
| Japan
| 
|-
| Loss
| align=center| 20–5–3
| Gilbert Yvel
| TKO 
| RINGS: Millennium Combine 1
| 
| align=center| 1
| align=center| 13:13
| Tokyo, Japan
| 
|-
| Loss
| align=center| 20–4–3
| Renato Sobral
| Decision (majority)
| rowspan=2|RINGS: King of Kings 1999 Final
| rowspan=2|
| align=center| 2
| align=center| 5:00
| rowspan=2|Tokyo, Japan
| 
|-
| Win
| align=center| 20–3–3
| Renzo Gracie
| Decision (unanimous)
| align=center| 2
| align=center| 5:00
| 
|-
| Win
| align=center| 19–3–3
| Borislav Jeliazkov
| Submission (rear-naked choke)
| rowspan=2|RINGS: King of Kings 1999 Block B
| rowspan=2|
| align=center| 2
| align=center| 1:17
| rowspan=2|Osaka, Japan
| 
|-
| Win
| align=center| 18–3–3
| Dave Menne
| Decision (unanimous)
| align=center| 2
| align=center| 5:00
| 
|-
| Win
| align=center| 17–3–3
| Joop Kasteel
| Submission (armbar)
| RINGS: Rise 5th
| 
| align=center| 2
| align=center| 2:17
| Japan
| 
|-
|  Draw
| align=center| 16–3–3
| Yoshihisa Yamamoto
| Draw
| RINGS: Rise 4th
| 
| align=center| 3
| align=center| 5:00
| Japan
| 
|-
| Win
| align=center| 16–3–2
| Tariel Bitsadze
| Submission (rear-naked choke)
| RINGS: Rise 3rd
| 
| align=center| 1
| align=center| 9:19
| Japan
| 
|-
|  Draw
| align=center| 15–3–2
| Frank Shamrock
| Draw
| RINGS: Rise 2nd
| 
| align=center| 1
| align=center| 20:00
| Japan
| 
|-
| Win
| align=center| 15–3–1
| Hiromitsu Kanehara
| Submission (armbar)
| RINGS: Rise 1st
| 
| align=center| 3
| align=center| 0:14
| Japan
| 
|-
| Win
| align=center| 14–3–1
| Valentijn Overeem
| Submission (armbar)
| RINGS: Final Capture
| 
| align=center| 1
| align=center| 6:08
| Japan
| 
|-
| Win
| align=center| 13–3–1
| Kenichi Yamamoto
| TKO 
| RINGS: World Mega Battle Tournament
| 
| align=center| 2
| align=center| 1:26
| Japan
| 
|-
|  Draw
| align=center| 12–3–1
| Tsuyoshi Kohsaka
| Draw
| RINGS: Fourth Fighting Integration
| 
| align=center| 1
| align=center| 30:00
| Tokyo, Japan
| 
|-
| Loss
| align=center| 12–3
| Tariel Bitsadze
| TKO 
| RINGS: Third Fighting Integration
| 
| align=center| 1
| align=center| 3:39
| Tokyo, Japan
| 
|-
| Win
| align=center| 12–2
| Mikhail Ilyukhin
| Submission
| rowspan=3|RINGS: Battle Dimensions Tournament 1997 Final
| rowspan=3|
| align=center| N/A
| align=center| N/A
| rowspan=3|N/A
| 
|-
| Win
| align=center| 11–2
| Akira Maeda
| N/A
| align=center| N/A
| align=center| N/A
| 
|-
| Win
| align=center| 10–2
| Joop Kasteel
| KO 
| align=center| N/A
| align=center| N/A
| 
|-
| Win
| align=center| 9–2
| Hans Nijman
| Submission (kimura)
| RINGS: Mega Battle Tournament 1997 Semifinal 1
| 
| align=center| N/A
| align=center| N/A
| N/A
| 
|-
| Win
| align=center| 8–2
| Volk Han
| Submission (armbar)
| RINGS: Extension Fighting 7
| 
| align=center| N/A
| align=center| N/A
| N/A
| 
|-
| Win
| align=center| 7–2
| Tsuyoshi Kohsaka
| Submission (toe hold)
| RINGS: Extension Fighting 2
| 
| align=center| N/A
| align=center| N/A
| N/A
| 
|-
| Win
| align=center| 6–2
| Andre Mannaart
| Submission (rear-naked choke)
| RINGS Holland: The Final Challenge
| 
| align=center| N/A
| align=center| N/A
| N/A
| 
|-
| Loss
| align=center| 5–2
| Volk Han
| N/A
| RINGS: Budokan Hall 1997
| 
| align=center| N/A
| align=center| N/A
| N/A
| 
|-
| Loss
| align=center| 5–1
| Volk Han
| N/A
| rowspan=3|RINGS: Battle Dimensions Tournament 1996 Final
| rowspan=3|
| align=center| N/A
| align=center| N/A
| rowapan=3|N/A
| 
|-
| Win
| align=center| 5–0
| Yoshihisa Yamamoto
| Submission (neck crank)
| align=center| N/A
| align=center| N/A
| 
|-
| Win
| align=center| 4–0
| Mitsuya Nagai
| Submission (scarf hold armlock)
| align=center| 1
| align=center| 6:13
| 
|-
| Win
| align=center| 3–0
| Mikhail Ilyukhin
| Submission 
| RINGS: Battle Dimensions Tournament 1996 Opening Round
| 
| align=center| N/A
| align=center| N/A
| N/A
| 
|-
| Win
| align=center| 2–0
| Maurice Smith
| Submission (armbar)
| RINGS: Maelstrom 6
| 
| align=center| N/A
| align=center| N/A
| N/A
| 
|-
| Win
| align=center| 1–0
| Patrick Smith
| Submission (heel hook)
| K-1 Hercules
| 
| align=center| N/A
| align=center| N/A
| N/A
|

Mixed rules 

| Win
| align=center| 2–0
| Masahito Kakihara
| Submission (rear-naked choke)
| UWF-i Sakigake 
| 
| align=center| 1
| align=center| 2:06
| Urayasu, Chiba, Japan
|
|-
| Win
| align=center| 1–0
| Matthew Saad Muhammad
| Submission (rear-naked choke)
| UWF-i Combat Sport Yokohama
| 
| align=center| 1
| align=center| 0:38
| Yokohama, Kanagawa, Japan
| 
|-

Submission grappling record
KO PUNCHES
|- style="text-align:center; background:#f0f0f0;"
| style="border-style:none none solid solid; "|Result
| style="border-style:none none solid solid; "|Opponent
| style="border-style:none none solid solid; "|Method
| style="border-style:none none solid solid; "|Event
| style="border-style:none none solid solid; "|Date
| style="border-style:none none solid solid; "|Round
| style="border-style:none none solid solid; "|Time
| style="border-style:none none solid solid; "|Notes
|-
|Draw|| Kazushi Sakuraba and  Hideo Tokoro || Draw || Rizin FF 1|| 2016|| 1|| 15:00||
|-
|Loss|| Ricardo Liborio || Submission (armbar) || ADCC 2001 –88 kg|| 2001|| 1|| 1:02||
|-

References

External links 
 
 Kiyoshi Tamura YouTube Channel
 Kiyoshi Tamura MMA Record from ESPN (incomplete)

1969 births
Living people
Japanese male professional wrestlers
Japanese male mixed martial artists
Light heavyweight mixed martial artists
Middleweight mixed martial artists
Welterweight mixed martial artists
Mixed martial artists utilizing catch wrestling
Mixed martial artists utilizing shoot wrestling
Mixed martial artists utilizing Sumo
Japanese catch wrestlers
Sportspeople from Okayama